Crude is the first studio album from Shetland based band Bongshang.

Track listing
 "Le Introducement" - 1:02
 "Things to Come" - 3:59
 "The Floggin' Set" - 2:04
 "If & When" - 5:01
 "Lee Highway Blues" - 2:41
 "Phosphene/Tamlin" - 6:48
 "The Hangman's Reel" - 1:58
 "Dig a Hole" - 4:55
 "Scotland/Frosty Morning" - 3:34
 "A.K.A. Crude" - 4:35
 "Wedding Row" - 5:54
 "Reprise" - 2:05

Personnel
 JJ Jamieson - banjo, vocals, lawnmower
 Bryan Peterson - bass guitar, double bass
 Leonard Scollay - fiddle
 Neil Preshaw - electric guitar, acoustic guitar
 Christopher 'Kipper' Anderson - drums, percussion

Sleeve notes

Production notes
This was the first CD to be produced in Shetland and sold out in four days
Crude was recorded in the Garrison Theatre, Lerwick, by sound engineer Stevie Hook and Bongshang members
The album was originally released on CD and cassette on Bongshang's own label "Doovf Records". It was later re-released and distributed internationally by the "Iona" record label.
The song 'Dig a Hole' features lyrics by Harry Horse of Swamptrash

References

External links
 www.bongshang.com

1993 albums
Shetland music